Alaa Shoier is an Egyptian actor, born in Cairo, Egypt on 15 October 1992, known for his roles in the Nesr El Saeed (Eagle of Upper Egypt) and Khat Sakhen (Hotline) series released in 2018. He worked in numerous lead roles like Dream and 9th Street, which are yet to be aired.

Early life and education 
Alaa Shoier completed his graduation in Mass Media and Communication from the American College of Greece and his masters in Leadership and Innovation in Contemporary Media from the American University in Dubai.

Career 
Alaa Shoier started his acting career in 2018 with his roles in the Egyptian television industry. Some of his notable works are:
Eagle of Upper Egypt
9th Street
Dream
Hotline

References 

Living people
1992 births
Male actors from Cairo
Egyptian male film actors
Egyptian male television actors